Luke Fox can refer to:

Real people
 Luke Foxe, also known as Luke Fox, an English explorer
 Luke Fox (judge), an Irish judge

Fictional characters
 Luke Fox (character), also known as Batwing, a DC Comics superhero